James Ferdinand Izlar (November 25, 1832 – May 26, 1912) was a U.S. Representative from South Carolina. He was also a slave owner.

Biography
Born near Orangeburg, South Carolina, Izlar attended the common schools. He graduated from Emory College in Oxford, Georgia, in 1855.  He studied law and was admitted to the bar in 1858.  He served as an officer in the Confederate States Army during the Civil War.  After the war, he resumed the practice of law in Orangeburg.

He served as member of the State senate 1880–1890, and was elected by the general assembly to be judge of the first judicial circuit in 1889.  He served as delegate to the Democratic National Convention in 1884.  Izlar was elected as a Democrat to the Fifty-third Congress to fill the vacancy caused by the resignation of William H. Brawley and served from April 12, 1894, to March 3, 1895.  He was not a candidate for renomination in 1894.

He again engaged in the practice of law in Orangeburg until 1907, when he retired.  He died at his home in Orangeburg on May 26, 1912, and was interred in the Episcopal Cemetery.

References

External links 

1832 births
1912 deaths
Confederate States Army officers
Democratic Party members of the United States House of Representatives from South Carolina
19th-century American politicians
People from Orangeburg, South Carolina
Emory University alumni
People of South Carolina in the American Civil War
American slave owners